Dommartin is a commune in the Nièvre department in central France.

Demographics
On 1 January 2019, the estimated population was 164.

See also
Communes of the Nièvre department
Parc naturel régional du Morvan

References

Communes of Nièvre
Nièvre communes articles needing translation from French Wikipedia